Babson may refer to:

Babson College, private business school in Wellesley, Massachusetts, United States
Babson (surname)
Babson Park, Florida, census-designated place in Florida, United States
Babson task, chess problem
Babson-United, Inc., American financial services company
Babson-Alling House, historic house in Gloucester, Massachusetts, United States